This list is intended as a quick reference for individuals mentioned in the Book of Mormon.

Notation

Names with superscripts (e.g., Nephi1) are numbered according to the index in the LDS scripture, the Book of Mormon. Missing indices indicate people in the index who are not in the Book of Mormon; for instance, Aaron1 is the biblical Aaron, brother of Moses.

 Bold type indicates the person was an important religious figure, such as a prophet or a missionary.
 Italic type indicates the person was a king, chief judge or other ruler.
 Underlined type indicates the person was a historian or record keeper; one whose writing (abridged or not) is included in The Book of Mormon.
 Combined typefaces indicate combined roles. For example, bold italic indicates an individual was both a religious and secular leader.

A
 Aaron2, descendant of Heth2 Jaredite king
 Aaron3, son of Mosiah2, Nephite missionary
 Aaron4, Lamanite king (c. AD 330)
 Abinadi, Nephite prophet sent to people of Lehi-Nephi - converted Alma1(c. 150 BC)
 Abinadom, son of Chemish, Nephite historian, and Nephite warrior.
 Abish, Lamanite woman, servant of Lamoni's wife
 Aha, Nephite military officer (c. 80 BC)
 Ahah, son of Seth2, Jaredite king
 Akish, son of Kimnor, Jaredite king
 Alma1, Nephite prophet (c. 173-91 BC)
 Alma2, son of Alma1, known as Alma the Younger. Nephite prophet and first chief judge (c. 100-73 BC).
 Amaleki1, Nephite record keeper (c. 130 BC)
 Amaleki2, seeker of Zeniff's people (c. 121 BC)
 Amalickiah, Nephite traitor who becomes king of the Lamanites and wars with Nephites - killed by Teancum (c. 70 BC)
 Amaron, son of Omni, Nephite record keeper
 Aminadab, Nephite dissenter living among the Lamanites - reconverted by Nephi2 and Lehi4  (c. 30 BC)
 Amgid, a Jaredite king.
 Aminadi, descendant of Nephi1
 Amlici, Nephite dissenter (c. 87 BC)
 Ammah, Nephite missionary, companion of Aaron3
 Ammaron, Nephite record keeper (c. AD 306)
 Ammon1, leader of expedition to land of Nephi (c. 121 BC)
 Ammon2, son of Mosiah2, missionary to the Lamanites, becomes chief judge in land of Jershon to Anti-Nephi-Lehites (c. 100 BC)
 Ammoron, Nephite traitor, brother of Amalickiah, king of Lamanites after Amalickiah's death - killed by Teancum (c. 66-61 BC)
 Amnigaddah, son of Aaron2, Jaredite king
 Amnor, Nephite spy in Amlicite campaign (c. 87 BC)
 Amoron, a Nephite from the fifth century AD  (c. AD 380–400), and was a contemporary and subordinate of the prophet and army commander Mormon. During the final war between the Lamanites and Nephites, Amoron reported to Mormon.
 Amos1, son of Nephi4, Nephite record keeper (c. AD 110–194)
 Amos2, son of Amos1, Nephite record keeper (c. AD 194–306)
 Amulek, son of Giddonah1, Nephite missionary, companion of Alma2
 Amulon, priest of King Noah, tributary Nephite monarch of Land of Helam
 Antiomno, Lamanite king of land of Middoni.
 Antionah, a chief ruler in Ammonihah
 Antionum, Nephite commander (c. AD 385)
 Antipus, Nephite commander in city of Judea.(c. 65 BC)
 Archeantus, Nephite soldier, one of three "choice men" (Moroni 9) slain in battle (c. AD 375)

B
 Benjamin, known as King Benjamin, Nephite prophet and king (c. 120 BC)
 Brother of Jared2, (also Mahonri Moriancumer), Jaredite prophet and the most prominent person in the account given in the beginning (Chapters 1 - 6) of the Book of Ether.

C
 Captain Moroni, see Moroni1
 Cezoram, eighth Nephite chief judge (c. 30 BC), preceded by Nephi, son of Helaman, and succeeded by his son, and eventually by Seezoram.  Cezoram and Seezoram are two different people and should not be confused with one another.
 Chemish, son of Omni, Nephite record keeper
 Christ, see Jesus Christ
 Cohor1, brother of Noah2
 Cohor2, early Jaredite king, son of Corihor1 and brother to Noah. He joined his brother Noah, with "all his brethren and many of the people" to establish a rival kingdom to Shule's. There are no further references, but he seems to have been influential, for his brother Noah later names a son after him and the name is passed down to the end of the Jaredite lineage.
 Cohor3, late Jaredite
 Com1, early Jaredite king, son of Coriantum1
 Com2, late Jaredite king
 Corianton, son of Alma2
 Coriantor, late Jaredite, son of Moron, father of Ether. Although his father had been king, Coriantor "dwelt in captivity all his days".
 Coriantum1, early Jaredite king, son of Emer
 Coriantum2, middle Jaredite, son of Amnigaddah
 Coriantumr3, early Jaredite, son of Omer
 Coriantumr1, Jaredite king, last Jaredite survivor
 Coriantumr2, Nephite apostate, commander of Lamanite forces
 Corihor1, son of Kib, early Jaredite
 Corihor2, late Jaredite, not to be confused with Korihor
 Corom, middle Jaredite king, son of Levi2
 Cumenihah, Nephite commander (c. AD 385)

E
 Emer, early Jaredite king and son of Omer.
 Emron, Nephite soldier 

 Enos2, son of Jacob2, Nephite prophet and record keeper
 Esrom, early Jaredite and son of Omer.
 Ethem, later Jaredite king and son of Ahah.
 Ether (Book of Mormon prophet), Jaredite prophet and record keeper
 Ezias, prophet referenced in Helaman 8:20

G
 Gadianton, chief of Gadianton robbers (c. 50 BC)
 Gid, Nephite military officer (c. 63 BC)
 Giddianhi, chief of Gadianton robbers (c. AD 16–21)
 Giddonah1, Amulek's father
 Giddonah2, high priest in Gideon (c. 75 BC)
 Gideon, Nephite patriot (c. 145-91 BC) 
 Gidgiddonah, deceased Nephite commander (c. AD 385)
 Gidgiddoni, Nephite commander (c. AD 16)
 Gilead, Jaredite military commander 
 Gilgah, early Jaredite
 Gilgal, deceased Nephite commander at the battle of Cumorah (c. AD 385).

H
 Hagoth, Nephite shipbuilder (c. 55 BC)
 Hearthom, middle Jaredite king and son of Lib1.
 Helam, convert from the people of Noah2 (c. 147 BC). First of those baptized by Alma1
 Helaman1, son of King Benjamin (c. 130 BC), brother of Mosiah2 and Helorum.  Helaman is only mentioned in one verse.
 Helaman2, eldest son of Alma2, prophet and military commander (c. 74-56 BC)
 Helaman3, eldest son of Helaman2 - sixth Nephite chief judge
 Helem, brother of Ammon2
 Helorum, son of King Benjamin (c. 130 BC), brother of Mosiah2 and Helaman1.  Helorum is mentioned in only one verse, but is addressed with his brothers by King Benjamin.
 Hem, brother of Ammon2
 Heth1, early Jaredite and son of Com1.
 Heth2, middle Jaredite and son of Hearthom.
 Himni, son of Mosiah2 (c. 100-74 BC)

I
 Isabel, harlot in land of Siron (c. 73 BC)
 Isaiah2, one of twelve Nephite disciples (c. AD 34)
 Ishmael1, an Ephraimite from Jerusalem (c. 600 BC)
 Ishmael2, grandfather of Amulek

J
 Jacob2, son of Lehi1, Nephite prophet and record keeper
 Jacob3, Nephite apostate (c. 64 BC)
 Jacob4, Nephite apostate (c. AD 30–33)
 Jacom, son of Jared2, early Jaredite
 Jared2, founder of Jaredites
 Jared3, early Jaredite king
 Jarom, son of Enos2, Nephite record keeper
 Jeneum, Nephite commander (c. AD 385)
 Jeremiah2, one of twelve Nephite disciples (c. AD 34)
 Jesus Christ, Savior and Redeemer
 Jonas1, son of Nephi3, one of twelve Nephite disciples (c. AD 34)
 Jonas2, one of twelve Nephite disciples (c. AD 34)
 Joseph2, son of Lehi1 (c. 595 BC)
 Josh, Nephite commander (c. AD 385)

K
 Kib, early Jaredite king
 Kim, Jaredite king and son of Morianton1.
 Kimnor, early Jaredite
 King Benjamin (see Benjamin)
 Kish, Jaredite king and son of Corom.
 Kishkumen, leader of robbers
 Korihor, an antichrist (c. 74 BC)
 Kumen, one of twelve Nephite disciples (c. AD 34)
 Kumenonhi, one of twelve Nephite disciples (c. AD 34)

L
 Laban, custodian of the brass plates (c. 600 BC)
 Lachoneus1, eleventh known Nephite chief judge (c. AD 1)
 Lachoneus2, son of Lachoneus1, twelfth known (and last) Nephite chief judge (c. AD 29–30)
 Lamah, Nephite commander (c. AD 385)
 Laman1, eldest son of Lehi1 (c. 600 BC)
 Laman2, Lamanite king (c. 200 BC)
 Laman3, son of Laman2 (c. 178 BC)
 Laman4, Nephite soldier
 Lamoni, Lamanite king converted by Ammon2
 Lehi1, Hebrew prophet who led his followers to promised land in western hemisphere  (c. 600 BC), father of Laman, Lemuel, Nephi1, and Sam.
 Lehi2, son of Zoram2, possibly same as Lehi3.
 Lehi3, Nephite military commander
 Lehi4, son of Helaman2, Nephite missionary
 Lehonti, Lamanite officer (c. 72 BC)
 Lemuel, second son of Lehi1
 Levi2, middle Jaredite king and son of Kim.
 Lib1, middle Jaredite king and son of Kish.
 Lib2, late Jaredite king
 Limhah, Nephite commander (c. AD 385)
 Limher, Nephite soldier (c. 87 BC)
 Limhi, son of Noah3, third Nephite king in land of Lehi-Nephi (c. 121 BC)
 Luram, Nephite soldier, one of three "choice men" (Moroni 9) slain in battle  (c. AD 375)

M
 Mahah, son of Jared3
 Manti, Nephite soldier (c. 87 BC)
 Mathoni, one of twelve Nephite disciples (c. AD 34)
 Mathonihah, one of twelve Nephite disciples (c. AD 34)
 Morianton1, Jaredite king and son of Riplakish.
 Morianton2, founder of the Nephite city of Morianton, Nephite traitor and ruler of the people of Morianton, instigator of the Lehi-Morianton border dispute.
 Mormon1, father of Mormon2
 Mormon2, abridger of the Nephite record, military commander, historian, record keeper.
 Moron, late Jaredite king who reigned during a time of great wickedness and turmoil, and was himself wicked. He lost half his kingdom for many years in a rebellion and, after regaining his kingdom, was completely overthrown and lived out his life in captivity. He was the grandfather of the prophet Ether.
 Moroni1, known as Captain Moroni, Nephite military commander (c. 99-56 BC)
 Moroni2, son of Mormon2, Nephite prophet
 Moronihah1, son of Moroni1, Nephite general (c. 60 BC)
 Moronihah2, Nephite general who perished at the battle of Cumorah, along with his ten-thousand (c. AD 385)
 Mosiah1, Nephite prophet and king, father of King Benjamin
 Mosiah2, son of King Benjamin, Nephite prophet and king (c. 154-91 BC)
 Mulek, son of Jewish king Zedekiah
 Muloki, Nephite missionary

N
 Nehor, Nephite apostate, religious theorist (c. 91 BC)
 Nephi1, son of Lehi1
 Nephi2, son of Helaman2 - seventh Nephite chief judge
 Nephi3, son of Nephi2, known as Nephi the Disciple
 Nephi4, son of Nephi3
 Nephihah, second Nephite chief judge (c. 83-67 BC).  He succeeded Alma the Younger when Alma had surrendered the judgment seat to him to devote more time to missionary work.  His son Pahoran inherited the judgment seat from him after his death.
 Neum, Hebrew prophet quoted by Nephi1
 Nimrah, son of Akish, Jaredite
 Noah2, son of Corihor1, early Jaredite king
 Noah3, son of Zeniff, Nephite king

O
 Omer, early Jaredite king and son of Shule.
 Omner, son of Mosiah2
 Omni, son of Jarom, Nephite record keeper
 Orihah, first Jaredite king

P
 Paanchi, son of Pahoran1, Nephite rebel (c. 52 BC)
 Pachus, king of Nephite dissenters in land of Zarahemla (c. 61 BC)
 Pacumeni, son of Pahoran1 fifth Nephite chief judge (c. 52 BC), brother of Pahoran, the son of Pahoran, and a contender for the judgement-seat over the people of Nephi.  After the death of his brother Pahoran, Pacumeni acquired the judgement-seat, but he didn't keep it long; for the land was being invaded by Lamanites, and Coriantumr, a large and mighty man and descendant of Zarahemla and dissenter from the Nephites, caught Pacumeni in his attempt to run away, and killed him at the city walls.  Helaman, son of Helaman, succeeded him as chief judge.
 Pagag, son of Brother_of_Jared2
 Pahoran1, son of Nephihah, third Nephite chief judge (c. 68 BC)
 Pahoran2, son of Pahoran1, fourth Nephite chief judge, killed by Kishkumen (c. 52 BC)

R
 Riplakish, Jaredite king and son of Shez1.

S
 Sam, third son of Lehi1 (c. 600 BC)
 Samuel2, Lamanite prophet (c. 6 BC)
 Sariah, wife of Lehi1 (c. 600 BC)
 Seantum, member of Gadianton band (c. 23 BC)
 Seezoram, member of Gadianton band, tenth known Nephite chief judge (c. 26 BC), eventually succeeded by Lachoneus.  How and when he began his reign as chief judge is not known; his first appearance in the Book of Mormon is when Nephi, son of Helaman, prophesied his murder by the hand of his brother, Seantum.  To give the wicked Nephites a sign that he, Nephi, was a prophet, he prophesied this murder to his people. Seezoram should not be confused with Cezoram, another Nephite chief judge who was assassinated earlier.
 Seth2, son of Shiblom1, Jaredite
 Shared, Jaredite military leader
 Shem2, Nephite commander (c. AD 385)
 Shemnon, one of twelve Nephite disciples (c. AD 34)
 Sherem, an antichrist (c. fifth century BC). Hugh Nibley states that "Sherem" means "snub nosed or pug nosed."
 Shez1, early Jaredite king and son of Heth1.
 Shez2, son of Shez1
 Shiblom1,) (also Shiblon), late Jaredite king and son of Com2.
 Shiblom2, Nephite commander (c. AD 385)
 Shiblon, son of Alma2, Nephite missionary & record-keeper
 Shiz, Jaredite military leader
 Shule, early Jaredite king

T
 Teancum, Nephite military leader (c. 67-60 BC)
 Teomner, Nephite military officer (c. 63 BC)
 Timothy, brother of Nephi2, one of twelve Nephite disciples (c. AD 34)
 Tubaloth, Lamanite king (c. 51 BC), son of Ammoron, the previous king.  He appointed Coriantumr, a mighty man and Nephite dissenter, to lead his armies.

Z
 Zarahemla, descendant of Mulek, leader of Mulek's colony
 Zedekiah2, one of twelve Nephite disciples (c. AD 34) 
 Zeezrom, Nephite lawyer, Converted by Alma2 and Amulek, later Nephite missionary (c. 82 BC)

 Zemnarihah, leader of Gadianton band (c. AD 21)
 Zenephi, Nephite commander (c. AD 375)
 Zeniff, Nephite king (c. 200 BC)
 Zenock, prophet of Israel
 Zenos, prophet of Israel
 Zerahemnah, Lamanite commander at Sidon battle (c. 74 BC)
 Zeram, Nephite military officer (c. 87 BC) 
 Zoram1, servant of Laban (c. 600 BC)
 Zoram2, Nephite chief captain (c. 81 BC)
 Zoram3, Nephite apostate (c. 74 BC)

See also
 List of Book of Mormon groups
 List of Book of Mormon places
List of Mormon place names
 List of Book of Mormon prophets
 Wars mentioned in the Book of Mormon

References

External links
Who's Who in the Book of Mormon? from mormonhaven.com

 People
Book of Mormon people
People